Fizber can be:
Fizber.com, a web site of for-sale-by-owner real estate.
A person engaging in For sale by owner (FSBO) real estate.